Silas B. Moore Gristmill is a historic grist mill located at Ticonderoga in Essex County, New York.  It was built in 1879–80 and is a two-story, three-bay wood-frame commercial building with shiplap siding and Italianate style details.  A two-story, rectangular addition completed about 1885 is attached to the rear of the main block.

It was listed on the National Register of Historic Places in 1988.

References

Grinding mills on the National Register of Historic Places in New York (state)
Italianate architecture in New York (state)
Industrial buildings completed in 1880
Buildings and structures in Essex County, New York
Grinding mills in New York (state)
National Register of Historic Places in Essex County, New York
1880 establishments in New York (state)